The Working Man is a 1933 pre-Code American comedy film directed by John G. Adolfi and starring George Arliss and Bette Davis. The screenplay by Charles Kenyon and Maude T. Howell is based on the story The Adopted Father by Edgar Franklin. The film is preserved in the Library of Congress collection.

Plot
Successful shoe manufacturer John Reeves is annoyed with his staff, particularly his conceited nephew and company general manager Benjamin Burnett (who considers himself the driving force behind the firm), because they are losing ground to their longtime chief rival, headed by former best friend Tom Hartland. The two men had had a falling out after falling in love with the same woman; she married Hartland, and Reeves remained a bachelor. Nevertheless, Reeves is saddened to learn of Hartland's death.

When Benjamin begins to muse that his uncle has started down the road to senility, Reeves decides to teach him a lesson. He heads off on a fishing vacation in Maine, leaving his nephew to deal with the business situation by himself.

By chance, a large yacht moors near his fishing boat. Jenny and Tommy Hartland, the party-loving offspring and heirs of Tom Hartland, swim over to see if anyone can supply them with liquor, Reeves is a little disgusted with their idle ways. Hiding his identity and calling himself John Walton, he befriends them in order to do a little spying on their company. However, as he gets to know them better, he begins to like them. They take him along with them back to New York, as they are responsible for his minor injury.

"Walton" gets them to take him on a tour of their plant, which he discovers is being deliberately mismanaged by Fred Pettison. He figures out that Pettison is driving it into bankruptcy so he can buy it cheaply later. Reeves persuades Tommy to have him appointed a trustee of the Hartland estate. Tommy and Jenny expect him to do away with the restraints imposed upon them. When two other trustees express their concern about the fisherman's qualifications, Reeves reveals his identity and the fact that he has grown fond of the young people who, if things had turned out differently, could have been his own children.

Once he becomes a trustee, he starts making wholesale changes, on both the domestic and business side. He quickly discharges most of the household servants, as the estate is nearly depleted, forcing Jenny and Tommy to mature quickly. Pettison is fired. Tommy begins working at his own company, while his sister, anxious to find out why their shoes are less popular than those manufactured by Reeves, takes a filing job with the rival company under the alias Jane Grey. She finds herself attracted to Benjamin. When Benjamin summons her to his office to fire her for her total lack of business skills, he finds her very attractive. Upon learning the news, she starts crying, and Benjamin reconsiders his decision. In the end, he reassigns her to work in his private office.

Meanwhile, Reeves has revitalized the Hartland Shoe Company, and it start making serious inroads into Reeves Company territory. Benjamin is puzzled, as the methods used by Hartland seem strikingly similar to those employed by Reeves. When Pettison shows up in Benjamin's office, looking for a job, he sees Jane. She begs him to keep her secret, but he tells Benjamin who she really is and lies, accusing her of spying on the company. This ends their budding romance.

In the end, Benjamin insists on meeting "John Walton", and Reeves has to reveal his true identity to the Hartlands. Once they get over the shock, and Reeves informs his nephew that Jenny was not a spy, the young couple reconcile. All agree to Reeves' proposal that the two companies merge.

Cast
 George Arliss as John Reeves 
 Bette Davis as Jenny Hartland, aka Jane Grey 
 Theodore Newton as Tommy Hartland 
 Hardie Albright as Benjamin Burnett 
 Gordon Westcott as Fred Pettison 
 J. Farrell MacDonald as Henry Davis

Production notes
The Warner Bros. release marked the second pairing of George Arliss and Bette Davis, who co-starred in The Man Who Played God the year before.

The film had its world premiere at Radio City Music Hall in New York City.

The 1936 film 20th Century Fox film Everybody's Old Man was based on the same source.

Principal production credits
 Producers: Jack L. Warner, Darryl F. Zanuck  
 Music supervision: Leo F. Forbstein  
 Cinematography: Sol Polito
 Art Direction: Jack Okey    
 Costume design: Orry-Kelly

Reception
In his review in The New York Times, Mordaunt Hall described the film as "breezy but somewhat shallow" and added "George Arliss offers an ingratiating charactier study in a role that suits him...Quite a number of [his] lines are humorous and there is no denying that the actor uses them most effectively. Bette Davis, whose diction is music to the ears, does good work in the role of Jenny."

TV Guide called it "a thoroughly enjoyable piece of entertainment which serves no other purpose than to put a smile on your face."

Box office
According to Warner Bros. records, the film earned $401,000 domestically and $421,000 foreign.

References

External links
 
 
 
 
 The Working Man at The AFI Catalog of Feature Films

1933 films
American black-and-white films
Films directed by John G. Adolfi
Films produced by Darryl F. Zanuck
American romantic comedy films
1933 romantic comedy films
Warner Bros. films
1930s English-language films
1930s American films